Paul Rivet (7 May 1876 – 21 March 1958) was a French ethnologist known for founding the Musée de l'Homme in 1937. In his professional work, Rivet is known for his theory that South America was originally populated in part by migrants who sailed there from Australia and Melanesia. He married Mercedes Andrade Chiriboga, who was from Cuenca, Ecuador.

Early life and education
Paul Rivet was born in Wasigny, Ardennes in 1876. He attended local schools and university, studying to be a physician.

Career
Trained as a physician, in 1901 he took part in the Second French Geodesic Mission for survey measurements of the length of a meridian arc to Ecuador. He remained for five years in South America, where he was mentored by Federico González Suárez, an Ecuadorian bishop, historian and archaeologist. Rivet became interested in the indigenous peoples, beginning an ethnographic study of the Huaorani people of the Ecuadorian Amazon, then known as the Jívaro. While in Ecuador he collected specimens of amphibians and reptiles. Returning to France, Rivet went to work with the Muséum national d'histoire naturelle, directed by René Verneau.

He published several papers on his Ecuadorian research, before publishing an extended volume co-authored with René Verneau, titled Ancient Ethnography of Ecuador (1921-1922). In 1926, Rivet participated in founding the Institut d'ethnologie in Paris, together with Marcel Mauss, Emile Durkheim, and Lucien Lévy-Bruhl. They intended it as a collaboration among the fields of philosophy, ethnology and sociology. He taught many French ethnologists, including George Devereux. In 1928, he succeeded René Verneau as director of the National Museum of Natural History.

He continued to develop institutions for the study of mankind. In 1937 he founded the Musée de l'Homme in Paris, which became renowned for its ethnographic research and collections. In 1942, Rivet went to Colombia, where he founded the Anthropological Institute and Museum. Returning to Paris in 1945, he continued teaching while carrying on his research. His linguistic research introduced several new perspectives on the Aymara and Quechua languages of South America.

Politics
Rivet also became involved in politics, alarmed at the rise of Fascism in Europe during the 1930s. During the 6 February 1934 crisis, he was one of the founders of the Comité de vigilance des intellectuels antifascistes, an antifascist organization created in the wake of massive riots in Paris.Rivet was a leader in the French Resistance to Nazi occupation. He narrowly escaped arrest and execution by the Nazis. Several of his colleagues, including Anatole Lewitsky and Boris Vilde were shot.

Linguistic classification

Rivet is well known for his classification of South American languages. He proposed 77 language families and about 1240 languages and dialects. Much of his work on language classification was later incorporated by John Alden Mason and his former student Čestmír Loukotka.

Migration theory
Rivet's theory asserts that Asia was the origin of the Indigenous people of the Americas. However, he also suggested that migrations to South America were made from Australia some 6,000 years before, and from Melanesia somewhat later. Les Origines de l'Homme Américain ("The Origins of the American Man") was published in 1943, and contains linguistic and anthropological arguments to support his thesis.

Honors
Rivet is commemorated in the scientific names of the South American snake Leptophis riveti and frog Pristimantis riveti.

Books
with René Verneau, 1921-1922. Ancient Ethnography of Ecuador.
1923. L'orfèvrerie du Chiriquí et de Colombie. Paris: Société des Américanistes de Paris.
1923. L'orfèvrerie précolombienne des Antilles, des Guyanes, et du Vénézuéla, dans ses rapports avec l'orfèvrerie et la métallurgie des autres régions américaines. Paris: Au siège de la société des Américanistes de Paris.
1943. Los origenes del hombre Americano. México: Cuadernos amerícanos.
1960. Maya cities: Ancient cities and temples. London: Elek Books.
with Freund, Gisèle, 1954. Mexique précolombien. Neuchâtel: Éditions Ides et calendes.

References

Sources
"Paul Rivet", Encyclopædia Britannica
Alarcón, Arturo G. 2006. Paul Rivet Y La Teoría Oceánica. 
D’Harcourt, Raoul. 1958. "Paul Rivet," American Anthropologist 60(4), 1180-1181
Rodriguez, Antonio O. 2003. Paul Rivet: Estudioso Del Hombre Americano, Panamericana Editorial. 
Spinney, Laura. 2020. "Defying the Nazis" Smithsonian Magazine, June, pages 10, 12-14.

1876 births
1958 deaths
People from Ardennes (department)
Politicians from Grand Est
French Section of the Workers' International politicians
Union progressiste politicians
Members of the Constituent Assembly of France (1945)
Members of the Constituent Assembly of France (1946)
Deputies of the 1st National Assembly of the French Fourth Republic
French ethnologists
Linguists of Hokan languages
Paleolinguists
Human Rights League (France) members
French Resistance members
Brazilianists
Linguists of indigenous languages of the Americas